Tales from the Elvenpath is Nightwish's first compilation release, released on 18 October 2004 by Drakkar Entertainment. Elvenpath is also the name of another Nightwish song, and although the compilation takes its name from that song, the song itself does not appear on the record, because that song is from the debut album, Angels Fall First, which was recorded with another record label.

Tales from the Elvenpath got Gold Disc in Finland, with 20.000 sold copies, and in Germany, with 100.000 sold copies.

Track listing

Credits
Tarja Turunen – lead vocals
Tuomas Holopainen – keyboards
Emppu Vuorinen – lead guitars
Jukka Nevalainen – drums
Marko Hietala – bass guitar
Sami Vänskä – bass guitar (all tracks except 3, 4, 14 and 15)

Charts

References

External links
Nightwish's Official Website

Nightwish albums
2004 compilation albums